Waynesville is a city in and the county seat of Pulaski County, Missouri, United States. Its population was 5,406 at the 2020 census. Located in the heart of the Missouri Ozarks, it was one of the communities served by historic Route 66.

History
Waynesville was platted in 1839. The city was named for Anthony Wayne. The post office in Waynesville has been in operation since 1834.

During the American Civil War, units of the 5th Missouri State Militia were sometimes garrisoned at Waynesville.

Geography
The Roubidoux Spring, 15th largest in the state, is located in the city limits. The Roubidoux Spring was also a stop on the infamous Trail of Tears.

Demographics

2010 census
At the 2010 census, there were 4,830 people, 1,894 households, and 1,252 families residing in the city. The racial make-up of the city was 73.6% White, 12.4% African American, 1.1% Native American, 3.4% Asian, 0.5% Pacific Islander, 2.5% from other races and 6.5% from two or more races. Hispanic or Latino of any race were 8.1% of the population.

There were 1,894 households, of which 37.8% had children under the age of 18 living with them, 49.3% were married couples living together, 13.3% had a female householder with no husband present, 3.5% had a male householder with no wife present and 33.9% were non-families. 28.9% of all households were made up of individuals, and 8.2% had someone living alone who was 65 years of age or older. The average household size was 2.48 and the average family size was 3.04.

The median age was 32.6 years. 28% of residents were under the age of 18, 8.8% were between the ages of 18 and 24;, 30.6% were from 25 to 44, 21.2% were from 45 to 64 and 11.2% were 65 years of age or older. The gender make-up of the city was 47.1% male and 52.9% female.

2000 census
At the 2000 census, there were 3,507 people, 1,428 households and 922 families residing in the city. The racial make-up of the city was 79.70% White, 10.98% African American, 0.94% Native American, 2.88% Asian, 0.11% Pacific Islander, 1.43% from other races and 3.96% from two or more races. Hispanic or Latino of any race were 3.11% of the population.

There were 1,428 households, of which 32.5% had children under the age of 18 living with them, 49.6% were married couples living together, 11.6% had a female householder with no husband present, and 35.4% were non-families. 31.3% of all households were made up of individuals and 10.5% had someone living alone who was 65 years of age or older. The average household size was 2.34 and the average family size was 2.93.

27.3% of the population were under the age of 18, 6.4% from 18 to 24, 29.3% from 25 to 44, 23.4% from 45 to 64, and 13.6% who were 65 years of age or older. The median age was 38 years. For every 100 females, there were 89.4 males. For every 100 females age 18 and over, there were 86.0 males.

The median household income was $41,250 and the median family income was $46,205. Males had a median income of $31,435 and females $23,640. The per capita income was $19,117. About 9.5% of families and 11.3% of the population were below the poverty line, including 16.9% of those under age 18 and 17.5% of those age 65 or over.

Climate
Waynesville experiences a humid subtropical climate (Köppen climate classification Cfa), as does much of southern Missouri.

Government
Waynesville is classified a 3rd Class City with an elected mayor and city council.

Due to the postponement of the 2020 election, Mayor Dr. Jerry Brown did not take office until June that year. The current city council members are Rob Rice and Bill Farnham (Ward 1), Cecil V. Davis and Clarence Liberty (Ward 2), Ed Conley and Sean A. Wilson (Ward 3), and Michael France and Michael Curtis (Ward 4). John Doyle is the city aAdministrator, and Michele Brown is the city clerk.

Education
Almost all of Waynesville is in Waynesville R-VI School District. A small portion is in Laquey R-V School District.

Waynesville Schools include Williams Early Childhood Development Center (Pre-K - Kindergarten), Wood Elementary (K-5), Pick Elementary (K-5), East Elementary (K-5), Freedom Elementary (K-5), Waynesville Sixth Grade Center (6th), Waynesville Middle School (7 & 8), and Waynesville High School (9-12).

Waynesville has a public library, a branch of the Pulaski County Library District.

Registered historic places
 Old Stagecoach Stop (also known as "Black Hotel" or "Pulaski House")
 Pulaski County Courthouse

Transportation

Waynesville Regional Airport at Forney Field serves the community with air service. Even though it is on Fort Leonard Wood, it is jointly run by the cities of Waynesville and St. Robert and is available for civilian use by private pilots and scheduled commercial passenger service.

The major east–west route is  Interstate 44; before that, the main highway was  U.S. Route 66, which still exists as a scenic route through the area and passes through Devil's Elbow, St. Robert, Waynesville, Buckhorn, and Hazelgreen. Names for U.S. Route 66 vary - at different places, it's called Teardrop Road, Highway Z, Old Route 66, Historic Route 66, and Highway 17. State-posted signs mark most of the alignment of the road.

The major north–south routes near Waynesville are:

  Route 17 which crosses Interstate 44 at exit 153 at Buckhorn, runs east through Waynesville, turns north to Crocker, and then runs north out of the county to Iberia. South of Interstate 44, Highway 17 hugs the western edge of Fort Leonard Wood, passes near Laquey, and circles south of the post until it runs out of the county and eventually joins Highway 32 in Roby.
  Highway T which runs north from Highway 17 at Waynesville to Swedeborg, where it meets and ends at Highway 133 about halfway between Richland and Crocker.

Major attractions along U.S. Route 66 include the Old Stagecoach Stop in downtown Waynesville, which is now a museum but began as a tavern and boarding house and is the oldest standing structure in the county. It was used as a Civil War hospital for Union troops who were garrisoned above the city in Fort Wayne, which was demolished after the war. The Old Courthouse Museum in downtown Waynesville is near the Old Stagecoach Stop.

The City Of Waynesville does not provide any public transportation (such as buses or shuttles).

Media 

Pulaski County has three weekly print newspapers, as well as an online Internet daily newspaper. The county also has two Internet discussion sites, the Pulaski County Web and Pulaski County Insider.

KFBD-FM and its AM sister station, KJPW, are the dominant news radio providers in the Pulaski County area, which includes Fort Leonard Wood, Waynesville and St. Robert. These stations compete with the only other station broadcasting from Pulaski County, KFLW Radio, owned by the Lebanon Daily Record and working locally from the St. Robert offices of the Pulaski County Mirror weekly newspaper.

The Daily Guide, commonly known as the Waynesville Daily Guide (and formerly called the Gateway Daily Guide), is based in St. Robert and serves the entire county. It is owned by GateHouse Media and is the central printing plant for three other GateHouse newspapers in nearby counties, the daily Camden Lake Sun Leader and Rolla Daily News as well as the weekly St. James Leader-Journal.

The content of the weekly Fort Leonard Wood Guidon is produced under the auspices of Army Public Affairs at Fort Leonard Wood, but printed under contract by the Springfield News-Leader, a Gannett-owned newspaper which produces and sells advertisements in the Fort Leonard Wood Guidon. The military contract to produce the Guidon was held by the Lebanon Daily Record until the end of 2002, and previously by the Waynesville Daily Guide for many years.

The weekly Pulaski County Mirror is owned by the Lebanon Daily Record, a family-owned newspaper in an adjoining county. The paper is a merger of the Richland Mirror and Pulaski County Democrat in St. Robert, which were separate weekly papers owned by the Lebanon Daily Record until their owner merged them in 2009.

The Pulaski County Daily News online newspaper is privately owned by a Waynesville resident.

The Pulaski County Insider is run and maintained by a businessman from St. Robert and hosted by a Potosi resident.

The county's other weekly paper, the Dixon Pilot, does not routinely cover Waynesville.

References

External links
 

Cities in Pulaski County, Missouri
County seats in Missouri
Cities in Missouri